Gay Bombay is an LGBT social organization in Mumbai, India, which promotes LGBT rights. It was founded in 1998. The organization works to create an awareness of gay rights through workshops, film screenings, and parties. The organisation aims to create a safe space for the LGBT community.

History 
Gay Bombay was founded in 1998. It is one of Mumbai's longest-running gay support groups, which has been hosting parties in different clubs since 2000.

Activities 
Gay Bombay organizes various LGBT events including dance parties, picnics, film festivals, film screenings parents meeting, trekking, cooking, speed-dating brunches, counselling sessions, meet-ups, gatherings, and discussions on topics such as HIV/AIDS and relationships.

In July 2009, Gay Bombay organized a party to celebrate the Delhi High Court's verdict on decriminalizing homosexuality in India. In 2008, the Queer Media Collective Awards was started by Gay Bombay to acknowledge and honor the media's support of the LGBT movement in India.

It organizes a talent show every year, Gay Bombay Talent Show, to provide a platform for LGBT artists.

In May 2017, Gay Bombay paid tribute to Dominic D'Souza, India's first AIDS activist by showing a short film on Positive People, an NGO founded by D'Souza.

In popular culture 
The book Gay Bombay: Globalization, Love and (Be)longing in Contemporary India (2008) by Parmesh Shahani, is based on characters and situations that the members of Gay Bombay experienced, reportedly to Mint.

See also 

 LGBT history in India
 LGBT culture in India
 List of LGBT rights organizations

References 

a Huggins19. Ganguly, Dibeyendu: (1 Dec,8 2015) For HR Chiefs, LGBT is the New Diversity Frontier, The Economic Times

Further reading

External links 
 
 The 2015 Gay Bombay Art Meet – A Photo Essay
 Out and Proud at Firstpost

LGBT political advocacy groups in India
LGBT history in India
LGBT culture in Mumbai
HIV/AIDS in India
LGBT in India
HIV/AIDS prevention organizations
1998 establishments in Maharashtra
Organizations established in 1998
Collectives
LGBT collectives